HR 9038 is a triple star system located thirty-five light-years away, in the constellation Cepheus. Component A is a spectroscopic binary system with an orbital period of 7.753 days and a combined stellar classification of K3 V. Component B is a red dwarf star that orbits the primary pair every 290 years.

References

External links 
 
 
 NStars: 2352+7532

Cepheus (constellation)
Durchmusterung objects
0909
223778
117712
9038
Triple star systems
K-type main-sequence stars
M-type main-sequence stars
Solar-type stars